The DFB-Pokal 2016–17 was the 37th season of the cup competition, Germany's second-most important competition in women's football.

Results

First round
The draw was held on 15 July 2016. Matches will be played on 20 and 21 August 2016. Number in bracket is the league level. Eight best clubs of 2015–16 Bundesliga season received a bye.

|}

Second round
Matches will be played on 8 and 9 October 2016. Eight best placed Bundesliga teams from last season join the 24 winners of the previous round.

|}

Round of 16
Matches were played from 2 to 21 December 2016.

|}

Quarterfinals
Matches were played on 15 March 2017.

|}

Semifinals
Matches were played on 16 April 2017.

Final
The final was played on 27 May 2017 in Cologne. It was a replay of last season's final, which Wolfsburg won 2–1.

Topscorers

References

Women
Pok
2016-17